Qismat 2 is a 2021 Indian Punjabi-language romantic drama film written and directed by Jagdeep Sidhu. The film produced by Ankit Vijan and Navdeep Narula has been bankrolled by Shri Narotam Ji Productions and Zee Studios. Starring Ammy Virk and Sargun Mehta, the film is a sequel of 2018 film Qismat.

Principal photography of the film began on 17 October 2020, with a muhurat shot. The film was released theatrically on 23 September 2021. On accounting its box office performance, currently the film finds place among top 15 highest-grossing Punjabi films of all times.

Cast
Cast of Qismat 2:
 Ammy Virk as Shivjit Singh
 Sargun Mehta as Bani Kaur
 Tania as Majaz Kaur
 Rupinder Rupi as Kabil's mother
 Satwant Kaur as Bani's mother
 Jaani as Kabil Singh, Bani's husband

Production
The film was conceived after the success of Qismat. In an interview director Jagdeep Sidhu told that film team was working on to bring another film as good as last one. This team including Ammy Virk, Sargun Mehta, Jagdeep Sidhu, Jaani and B Praak is planning a sequel. Mehta shared a post on Instagram that Qismat 2 is on the way. In May 2019, Sidhu confirmed the sequel with same crew. In July 2019, Virk also confirmed the film on his official social media handles. On 11 September 2019, Sidhu released the title poster of Qismat 2 with the release date as 18 September 2020. The script was ready by first week of July 2020. Due to COVID-19 pandemic the shooting of the sequel was delayed. Finally the filming began on 17 October 2020.

Soundtrack

Soundtrack of Qismat 2  is composed by B Praak, lyrics by Jaani and the songs are sung by B Praak, Nooran Sisters, Afsana Khan, Ammy Virk, Asees Kaur and Romy.  The soundtrack is released on Tips Punjabi. In Song "Mere Yaara Ve", Avvy Sra served as Music Composer. The songs "Qismat 2- Title track", "Teri Akhiyaan","Kis Morh Te" were composed by Jaani while songs "Janam", "Paagla" were composed by B Praak.

The title track Sung by B Praak was released on 24 August. Second track of the film, "Janam" was released on 2 September 2021, sung by Romy. Third Track of the film "Teri Akhiyaan" sung by Ammy Virk and Afsana Khan was released on 8 September 2021. Fourth track of the film "Kis Morh Te" was released on 18 September. "Mere Yaara Ve", the fifth song was released on 22 September. The last track of the film "Paagla" sung by B Praak and Asees Kaur was  released after the film release, on 9 October 2021.

Track list of Qismat 2

Release
The film was released theatrically on 23 September 2021.

Home Media
Qismat 2 was released for streaming on Over-the-top media service platform ZEE5 on 29 October 2021.

Reception
Bobby Sing of The Free Press Journal rated the film with 3 stars out of 5 and wrote, "Overall, Qismat 2, directed by Jagdeep Sidhu, can easily be called a nice, musical, emotionally moving, family entertainment package carefully conceived by the team."

Box office 

Qismat 2 opened with gross collection of 2.07 crore worldwide on first day of release. Opening weekend worldwide gross of the film was 12.27 crore, and opening week gross collection was 17.77 crore.

The film ,  has grossed  worldwide.

References

External links
 Qismat 2 at ZEE5
 
 

Indian romantic drama films
Films scored by B Praak
Punjabi-language Indian films
Indian sequel films
Films postponed due to the COVID-19 pandemic
2021 romantic drama films
Films directed by Jagdeep Sidhu